Jacquetta is a feminine given name which may refer to:

 Jacquetta of Luxembourg (1415/16–1472), Duchess of Bedford, Countess Rivers
 Jacquetta Hawkes (1910–1996), English archaeologist and writer
 Jacquetta May, British writer, actress and theatre director
 Jacquetta Wheeler, (born 1981), English model

Feminine given names